The 1937 Mississippi State Maroons football team represented Mississippi State College during the 1937 college football season. At the end of the season, popular head coach Ralph Sasse shocked students and fans by resigning after a nervous breakdown. Sasse finished 20–10–2 in his three seasons at Mississippi State.

Schedule

References

Mississippi State
Mississippi State Bulldogs football seasons
Mississippi State Maroons football